This list of Punjabi Hindu festivals summarizes festivals observed in Punjab. These are based on the Bikrami calendar. The festivals of Maghi and Vaisakhi are determined by the solar aspect and others on its lunar months.

Observance and overview
Punjabi Hindus follow the Bikrami calendar to observe religious festivals.

List and descriptions of major Hindu Punjabi festivals

Other festivals
In addition to the above, Punjabi Hindus observe other Punjabi festivals such as, Basant Festival of Kites, Lohri, Teej and Gugga.

Gallery

See also
List of festivals in India
List of Hindu festivals
 Punjabi calendar
 Punjab
 Hinduism in Punjab
 Punjabi culture

References

External links

Punjab
Festivals
Punjabi culture
Hindu festivals
Lists of religious festivals